Groß Flottbek, (Great Flottbek) is a quarter of Hamburg, Germany, in the borough of Altona. It is located in the center of the borough north of the Othmarschen quarter. Near Groß Flottbek, the neighbourhood of Klein Flottbek, which is not an official quarter, can be found. Around 11.000 people live in Groß Flottbek on 2.4 sq km.

Geography
Groß Flottbek borders the quarters of Bahrenfeld, Othmarschen, Nienstedten and Osdorf. The Flottbek stream flows through Groß Flottbek and into River Elbe near Teufelsbrück.

History
Groß Flottbek was first recorded in 1305. Between 1640 and 1866, Flottbek was part of Denmark. Along with Altona, of which it was a part since 1927, Groß Flottbek became a part of Hamburg in 1937/1938 through the Greater Hamburg Act. Today, the quarter is dominated by residential areas and mansions.

Politics
These are the results of Groß Flottbek in the Hamburg state election:

References

External links

 Groß Flottbek, Hamburg.de

Quarters of Hamburg
Altona, Hamburg